Heidi Genée (22 October 1938 – 26 September 2005) was a German film editor, director and screenwriter. She worked on more than 40 films between 1958 and 1984. Her 1977 film Grete Minde was entered into the 27th Berlin International Film Festival. Five years later, her film Kraftprobe was entered into the 32nd Berlin International Film Festival.

Selected filmography

 Horrors of Spider Island (1960 - directed by Fritz Böttger)
 Brutality in Stone (1961 - directed by Alexander Kluge and Peter Schamoni), short documentary
  (1962 - directed by Rolf von Sydow)
 Tonio Kröger (1964 - directed by Rolf Thiele)
 The River Line (1964)
 Golden Goddess of Rio Beni (1964)
 It  (1966 - directed by Ulrich Schamoni)
 No Shooting Time for Foxes (1966 - directed by Peter Schamoni)
  (1967 - directed by Roger Fritz)
 Next Year, Same Time (1967 - directed by Ulrich Schamoni)
  (1968 - directed by Eckhart Schmidt)
  (1968 - directed by Ulrich Schamoni)
  (1969 - directed by Peter Schamoni and Herbert Vesely)
  (1970 - directed by Ulrich Schamoni)
 Love, Vampire Style (1970 - directed by Helmut Förnbacher)
  (1970 - directed by )
 Ich liebe dich, ich töte dich (1971 - directed by )
 Hundertwasser's Rainy Day (1971 - directed by Peter Schamoni), short documentary
 Eins (1971 - directed by Ulrich Schamoni)
  (1972 - directed by Rudolf Thome)
 Kopf oder Zahl (1973 - directed by )
 Zahltag (1973 - directed by Hans Noever)
 La Victoria (1973 - directed by Peter Lilienthal)
  (1974 - directed by )
 Output (1974, directed by Michael Fengler)
 Schoolmaster Hofer (1975, directed by Peter Lilienthal)
 Lina Braake (1975 - directed by Bernhard Sinkel)
 John Glückstadt (1975 - directed by Ulf Miehe)
  (1975 - directed by Bernhard Sinkel and Alf Brustellin)
  (1976 - directed by Hark Bohm)
  (1976 - directed by Alexander Kluge)
 Grete Minde (1977 - directed by Heidi Genée)
 1+1=3 [de] (1979 - directed by Heidi Genée)
  (1981 - directed by Heidi Genée)
 Kraftprobe (1982 - directed by Heidi Genée)
 Flucht nach vorn (1983 - directed by Heidi Genée)
 Marlene (1984 - directed by Maximilian Schell), documentary
 Eine Reise nach Deutschland (1987, TV film - directed by Heidi Genée)
 Der Unsichtbare (1987 - directed by Ulf Miehe)
  (1990–1991, TV series)

References

External links

1938 births
2005 deaths
Mass media people from Berlin
Best Director German Film Award winners